Rape of the Bastard Nazarene is the first studio album by English death metal band Akercocke. It was released on 28 December 1999, through the band's own record label Goat of Mendes.

Musical style
AllMusic described the album's style as "an interesting mix of two musical styles that don't often go together. About half of Rape of the Bastard Nazarene [...] consists of utterly standard-issue death metal, complete with whiplash tempos, hyperspeed blast drumming and the often comical 'death growl' vocals. The other half of the album is doomy, synth-heavy post-punk, seemingly influenced by the likes of Killing Joke and (especially on the unexpectedly melodic, catchy "Marguerite & Gretchen") Pornography-era Cure."

Track listing

Tracks 11–13 are songs by Salem Orchid, and can be found on the re-issue. Originally released on audio demo tape in 1991, Mendonça and Gray composed and recorded these songs with guitarist Stephen Wood.

Personnel
Akercocke
 Jason Mendonça – guitars, vocals
 David Gray – drums
 Peter Theobalds – bass 
 Paul Scanlan – guitars 
 Martin Bonsoir – keyboards, recording, engineering, production 

Additional personnel
 Stephen Wood – guitars 
 Dan Temple – bass 
 Salem Orchid – production 
 Nicola Kemp, Tanya Warwick – additional vocals
 Peter Theobalds – design
 Stevvi – photography

References

Akercocke albums
1999 debut albums